Pereiro de Palhacana is a former civil parish, located in the municipality of Alenquer, in western Portugal. In 2013, the parish merged into the new parish Ribafria e Pereiro de Palhacana.

References

Former parishes of Alenquer, Portugal